Beibei District is a district in the Chongqing municipality, People's Republic of China. A satellite town in the north of central Chongqing, Beibei got its name because of the huge rock that extends to the middle of Jialing River, and is known for its historical culture in the period of the Republic of China.

Location and geography
Beibei is located at the outer side of the Chongqing Metropolitan Area. It shares borders with Shapingba (south), Bishan (west), Hechuan (north), and Yubei (east), on the west bank of Jialing River.

Climate

Administrative divisions

Colleges and universities
Southwest University (西南大學) (formed by a 2005 merger of the former Southwest China Normal University and Southwest Agricultural University, founded in 1906 and 1950 respectively)

High schools
High School Affiliated to Southwest University (西南大学附中)
Chongqing Chaoyang High School (重庆朝阳中学)
Chongqing Jianshan High School (重庆兼善中学)
Chongqing Jiangbei High School (重庆江北中学)

Transportation
Yuhe Expressway (Chongqing–Hechuan District; 渝合高速)
Xiangyu Railway(Xiangfan–Chongqing; 襄渝铁路)
Suiyu Railway(Suining–Chongqing; 遂渝铁路)
China National Highway 212

Metro
Beibei is served by one metro line operated by Chongqing Rail Transit:
- Caojiawan, Caijia, Xiangjiagang, Longfengxi, Tiansheng, Beibei

Industry
Beibei is one of the three national industry bases for measuring instrument.

Tourism
The North Spring (北温泉)
Jinyun Mountain (缙云山)
Golden Sword Gorge (金刀峡)
Three Gorges of Jialing River (嘉陵江小三峡)
Tomb of General Zhang Zizhong (抗日名将张自忠将军墓)
Former residences of Lao She and Liang Shih-Chiu (民国时期老舍旧居,梁实秋“雅舍”旧址)
Old campus of Fudan University during WW2 (抗战时期复旦大学旧址)

Gallery

References

External links

 Government of Beibei
Visit Beibei

Districts of Chongqing